Mark J. Stoyle  is a Tudor and Stuart British historian who specializes in the English Civil War, the nature of magic and witchcraft and the identity of key areas such as Cornwall and Wales during the early modern period. He is Professor at the University of Southampton, and also does much work on the history and landscape of Exeter where he previously lived and taught.

Biography
Mark Stoyle was raised in Mid Devon and attended school in Crediton. Upon finishing school, he took part in archaeological excavations in Exeter for some years. He received a BA in history in 1988. In 1992, he earned his doctorate at St Peter's College, Oxford under the supervision of Gerald Aylmer. After completing a Scouloudi Fellowship at the Institute of Historical Research and a British Academy Postdoctoral Research Fellowship at the University of Exeter, he joined the University of Southampton where he is presently a Professor of Early Modern History. In 2012, he won a Vice-Chancellor's Teaching Award from the University of Southampton.

Stoyle is a fellow of the Royal Historical Society, Chair of its Research Support Committee, and served on the Council of the Royal Historical Society until November 2016. He is also a member of the editorial advisory panel of BBC History.

Major publications
Loyalty and Locality: Popular Allegiance in Devon During the English Civil War (1994)
From Deliverance to Destruction: Civil War and Rebellion in an English City (1996)
Devon and the Civil War (2001)
West Britons: Cornish Identities and the Early Modern British State (2002)
Soldiers and Strangers: An Ethnic History of the English Civil War (2005)
The Black Legend of Prince Rupert's Dog: Witchcraft and Propaganda During the English Civil War (2011)
Water in the City: The Aqueducts and Underground Passages of Exeter (2014)
''A Murderous Midsummer: The Western Rising of 1549 (2022)

References

Year of birth missing (living people)
Living people
20th-century English historians
21st-century English historians
Academics of the University of Southampton
Alumni of St Peter's College, Oxford
English military historians
Fellows of the Royal Historical Society
Pagan studies scholars
People from Mid Devon District
Place of birth missing (living people)
Historians of Cornwall
Historians of Wales
Historians of Devon
Historians of the early modern period